Basini may refer to:

 Basinio Basini, (1425–1457), Italian humanist
 Mario Basini, (born 1943) Welsh-Italian journalist, broadcaster and author